Walter Taylor (c. 1700 – 23 February 1743/44) was a Trinity College, Cambridge tutor who coached 83 students in the 1724–1743 period. He later was appointed as the Regius Professor of Greek.

He was the son of John Taylor, Vicar of Tuxford, Nottinghamshire. He matriculated in 1716 from Wakefield School, Yorkshire. Taylor was admitted as a pensioner at Trinity on 7 April 1716.

Robert Smith was Taylor's Cambridge tutor.

Timeline
 1717 Scholar
 1719/20 BA
 1723 MA
 1736 BD
 1722 Fellow of Trinity
 1726–44 Regius Professor of Greek
 1725 Ordained deacon
 1726/7 Ordained priest
 1743/4 buried at Tuxford

Notes

External links
 

18th-century English mathematicians
1700 births
1744 deaths
Year of birth uncertain
Alumni of Trinity College, Cambridge
Fellows of Trinity College, Cambridge
Regius Professors of Greek (Cambridge)